Lucky Cement Limited (LCL) is the largest cement producer in Pakistan. Its shares are traded on the Pakistan Stock Exchange, and are part of the KSE 100 Index. The company's highest share price was PKR 1043.50, in May 2017
Lucky Cement is a part of one of the largest business groups in Pakistan, the Yunus Brothers Group.

Lucky Cement Limited recorded its highest ever profit after tax of Rs 13.69 billion for the year ending 30 June 2017.

History
Lucky Cement Limited (LCL) was founded in 1993 by Abdul Razzak Tabba. The company started with factories in the Pezu located in Lakki Marwat District of the Khyber Pakhtunkhwa Province. It now, also, owns a factory in Nooriabad, Jamshoro.

LCL is the largest producer and exporter of cement and clinker in Pakistan. The company has 15.3 million tonnes per annum of manufacturing capacity. The company is listed on the Pakistan Stock Exchange and London Stock Exchange.

Over the years, the company has grown substantially and is expanding its business operations with production facilities at strategic locations in Jamshoro District, Sindh and two field plants at Karachi on Super Highway to cater to the Southern regions, Pezu and Khyber Pakhtunkhwa to furnish the Northern areas of the country. LCL has a network of over 200 dealers which enables it to dominate the local market and is Pakistan's first company to export sizeable quantities of loose cement being the only cement manufacturer to have its own loading and storage terminal at Karachi Port.

LCL has been sponsored by one of the largest business groups in Pakistan, the Yunus Brothers Group, one of the largest textile export house of Pakistan, based in Karachi.

Products
In 2017, the company was producing Ordinary Portland Cement, Sulphate Resistant Cement, Block Cement and Clinker and had about an 18 percent share of the Pakistani cement market.

Power Generation
The company is producing enough electricity to not only fulfill its own requirements but has also started supplying electricity to Hyderabad Electric Supply Company (HESCO). and is now in the process of providing electricity to Peshawar Electric Power Company.

Geared to sustainable growth, The YB Group has diversified into the power generation sector by investing into Lucky Electric Power Company Limited (LEPCL).  The company is a wholly owned subsidiary of LCL Holding Limited making it an indirect subsidiary of Lucky Cement Limited. Being the largest importer of coal, Lucky Cement Limited's decision of investing in 660MW coal-based power project in Karachi will create synergy amongst its existing diversified business portfolio.

In July 2020, K-Electric Limited (Karachi) and Lucky Cement signed an agreement whereby K-Electric would buy up to 6 megawatt (MW) of electricity from Lucky Cement to be supplied to DHA City, Karachi being developed along Superhighway.

Alternate Fuel
Lucky Cement has shifted its focus to alternate fuel such as TDF and RDF.

Sustainability Reporting
In 2012, Lucky Cement was the only company in Pakistan to receive an A+ rating by Global Reporting Initiative (GRI) of Netherlands, for its Sustainability Report for 2012.

In 2019, Lucky Cement again won a second position in the cement category in the "Best Corporate & Sustainability Report Awards 2019" awarded by the Institute of Chartered Accountants of Pakistan (ICAP) and the Institute of Cost and Management Accountants of Pakistan (ICMAP).

Investments
 Lucky Electric Power Company Limited
 Lucky Motor Corporation

Awards and recognition
Lucky Cement was recognized by Asiamoney as Pakistan's most outstanding company under Asiamoney: Asia's Outstanding Companies Poll 2020 for Materials sector in Pakistan. This Asiamoney poll recognizes publicly listed companies across the region for their excellence in business areas and markets.

References

External links
Lucky Cement's company profile

Yunus Brothers Group
Cement companies of Pakistan
Manufacturing companies established in 1993
Companies listed on the Pakistan Stock Exchange
Pakistani brands
Manufacturing companies based in Karachi
Pakistani companies established in 1993